The Grand Bahama Open was a professional golf tournament that was held in Freeport on the island of Grand Bahama in The Bahamas from 1966 to 1973. It attracted many leading players from North America and in later years, Great Britain.

The tournament was hosted for the first four years at the Kings Inn & Golf Club, before moving to the Lucayan Country Club in 1970. The final three edition were held at Shannon Golf & Country Club.

Winners

A similarly named event was hosted by the Grand Bahama Hotel in 1962. Held over a single round, it was won jointly by two Americans, professional Dave Ragan and amateur Dexter Daniel, with a score of 71 (one-under par).

References

Golf tournaments in the Bahamas
Freeport, Bahamas